Górki  is a village in the administrative district of Gmina Klimontów, within Sandomierz County, Świętokrzyskie Voivodeship, in south-central Poland.

Notable people 
 Mieczysław Halka-Ledóchowski (1822–1902), Roman Catholic Cardinal-priest.

References

Villages in Sandomierz County